Mount Ovit Tunnel, is a highway tunnel at Mount Ovit between İkizdere, Rize Province and İspir, Erzurum Province in northeastern Turkey.

The tunnel was projected to connect Erzurum with Rize in order to enable Eastern Anatolian's access to the Black Sea. The first gateaway project dates back to 1880 during the Ottoman Empire times, without going into realization. The current route , however, it was built to bypass the Ovit Pass at  elevation.

The construction works of Mount Ovit Tunnel and its connection roads started with a groundbreaking ceremony held on 12 May 2012 in presence of Prime Minister Recep Tayyip Erdoğan. It was planned that the tunnel would be opened to traffic in 2015, but later the opening date was set to 2018.  Mount Ovit Tunnel is the world's 7th longest highway tunnel. The tunnel was opened on 13 June 2018 by Recep Tayyip Erdogan.

References
. 

Road tunnels in Turkey
Transport in Erzurum Province
Transport in Rize Province
Transport infrastructure in Turkey